"Lay It All on Me" is a song by British drum and bass band Rudimental. It features the vocals of Ed Sheeran. The song was recorded for Rudimental's second album, We the Generation (2015). On 24 September 2015, the band debuted the song on BBC Radio 1. It became available on streaming and downloading services the following day.

Background
Prior to "Lay It All on Me", Rudimental had previously collaborated with Sheeran, co-writing the song "Bloodstream" which appeared on the latter's 2014 album, x. The track was re-worked and released as the fourth single from x as well as the lead single from We the Generation.

The idea for "Lay It All on Me" was already in concept prior to Rudimental touring with Sheeran, providing opening support for the latter's American leg of his x tour. While on the tour bus, Rudimental played the song for Sheeran. According to Rudimental, Sheeran liked it and they ended up completing the song while in London.

The song is "about sticking together and brotherhood". Writing the song, Rudimental's inspiration was evoked by the fact of being away from home and family. The electronic track has a "pulsating" beat.

The official remix was released on 14 December 2015 featuring additional verses from Big Sean and Vic Mensa with a slightly different instrumental beat.

Chart performance
On the chart dated 17 October 2015, the song debuted on the Billboard Hot 100 at number 96, becoming Rudimental's first charting entry in the US, eventually peaking at number 48. The song debuted on the UK Singles Chart at number 16, giving Rudimental their eighth top 40. The following week, it reached a new peak of number 15. So far it has peaked at number 12.

Music video
The official music video was uploaded to Rudimental's YouTube channel on 6 November 2015.

Charts and certifications

Weekly charts

Year-end charts

Certifications and sales

References

2015 singles
2015 songs
Ed Sheeran songs
Rudimental songs
Black-and-white music videos
Song recordings produced by Rudimental
Songs written by Amir Amor
Songs written by Ed Sheeran
Songs written by Jacob Manson
Songs written by James Newman (musician)